"Guilty" is a song by American alternative metal band Since October. The song was released as the second single from the band's debut studio album, This Is My Heart. The song was a moderate success, peaking at No. 21 on the Billboard Mainstream Rock chart, staying on the chart for 20 weeks.

A demo version of "Guilty" originally appeared on the album Gasping for Hope.

Track listing

Charts

Personnel
 Ben Graham – lead vocals
 Luke Graham – guitar
 Josh Johnson – bass
 Audie Grantham – drums, screamed vocals

References

External links
Official Music Video at YouTube

o

2008 songs
2009 singles
Tooth & Nail Records singles
Since October songs